Sergey Bestuchev (Russian: Сергей Бестучев) is a paralympic swimmer from Russia competing mainly in category SB9 events.

At the 1996 Summer Paralympics Sergey finished third in the 100m breaststroke behind Dutch pair Alwin de Groot and world record setter Jurjen Engelsman, he also swam in the 100m freestyle and 200m medley but failed to make the final in either event.

References

External links
 

Year of birth missing (living people)
Living people
Russian male breaststroke swimmers
Russian male freestyle swimmers
Paralympic swimmers of Russia
Paralympic bronze medalists for Russia
Paralympic medalists in swimming
Swimmers at the 1996 Summer Paralympics
Medalists at the 1996 Summer Paralympics
Russian male medley swimmers
S10-classified Paralympic swimmers
20th-century Russian people